The Mobile Gendarmerie (GM) is a subdivision of the French National Gendarmerie whose main mission is to maintain public order (from crowd control to riot control) and general security.  Contrary to the Departmental Gendarmerie, whose jurisdiction is limited to specific parts of the territory, the Mobile Gendarmerie can operate anywhere in France and even abroad as the Gendarmerie is a component of the French Armed Forces. Although the term "mobile" has been used at different times in the 19th century, the modern Mobile Gendarmerie was created in 1921.

The Mobile Gendarmerie is nicknamed la jaune (the yellow one) because of its golden rank insignia, the traditional color of infantry in the French Army (the Departmental Gendarmerie, like most Gendarmerie branches wear the silver insignia of the cavalry and other mounted arms).

The Mobile Gendarmerie is often mistaken with the National Police's CRS, as some of their missions are similar, but they have a different status, military for the gendarmes and civilian for the CRS.

History

The term "mobile" was used at various times in the 18th and 19th centuries to name various Gendarmerie or mixed Gendarmerie-Army units: mobile battalions, mobile columns, etc. engaged in public order duties. By the beginning of the 20th century, it was realized that there was a need for an intermediate force between the Police and the Army, which until then had been frequently called upon in case of trouble, very often with disastrous results (fraternization in a few cases, use of excessive violence in most of the others). The Departmental Gendarmerie  also contributed platoons composed of gendarmes on temporary duty taken from local brigades but these men had received no specific training in crowd control, were not under the command of their regular officers and this service was not popular as it took the men away from the brigades for weeks at a time and considerably disrupted the service. Still, many lawmakers were reluctant to create a dedicated force which – they thought – would be costly and might become a new Praetorian guard.

Starting in 1917, platoons from the Provost Gendarmerie (a branch of the Gendarmerie set up as a military police force for the duration of the war) were frequently used in crowd control and riot control duties during demonstrations - even in large cities away from the front.

In 1921, it was finally decided to create "Mobile Gendarmerie platoons" in the Departmental Gendarmerie. Platoons, either horse mounted or on foot were composed of 40 gendarmes (60 in the Paris Region). In 1926, the platoons formed the "Garde Républicaine mobile" (GRM), which became a separate branch of the Gendarmerie in 1927, the platoons becoming part of companies and legions. By 1940, the GRM was a force 21,000 strong, composed of 14 légions, 54 company groups and 167 companies.

Long the only large force specialized in maintaining or restoring law and order during demonstrations or riots, the GRM progressively developed the doctrine and skills needed in that role : exercise restraint, avoid confrontation as long as possible, always leave an "exit door" for the crowd etc.

More than 6,000 GMR gendarmes fought in 1940 either in line Gendarmerie combat units or as detached personnel seconded to the Army. After the 1940 armistice, the Germans demanded that the GRM be disestablished. A new organization, 6,000 strong, called "La Garde", separate from the Gendarmerie, was created, staffed primarily with former GRM gendarmes and was attached, first to the minimal French Armistice Army remaining in the unoccupied zone, then after the whole country was occupied in the wake of the Allied landings in Africa in November 1942, to the Ministry of Interior. Being attached to the cavalry branch of the Army, the Garde traded its companies for squadrons.

After the Liberation, the Garde was disbanded and the GMR recreated within the Gendarmerie under the new designation of Garde républicaine In 1954, it acquired its present name of Gendarmerie mobile.

The Garde républicaine/Gendarmerie mobile served during both Indochina and Algerian conflicts. In metropolitan France, its main missions remained first, that of maintaining law and order during demonstrations and second, to assist the Departmental Gendarmerie in its general security missions. An additional mission during the Cold War was Défense opérationnelle du Territoire (DOT) or territorial operational defense against infiltrated enemy or subversive elements, for which the Mobile Gendarmerie was partially equipped with armoured vehicles and tanks. During the post-war years, all new Gendarmes started their career in the Mobile Gendarmerie.

In 2009, the Gendarmerie, while remaining part of the French Armed Forces, was attached to the Ministry of the interior, which already supervised the National Police, without changes to its missions. As a consequence of that change, the formal requisition process which the Ministry of the interior needed in order to use Mobile Gendarmerie forces (just like any other military force) is not used anymore.

Missions

The GM's main missions include:

 crowd control and security during demonstrations and public events
 riot control 
 reinforcement of the Departmental Gendarmerie in its general security missions
 escort of high-risk convoys (large money transfers, nuclear waste convoys, etc.)
 protection of high-risk sites (US and Israel embassies etc.)
 participation in missions of the French Armed Forces abroad (called "external operations" or Opex).

Organisation

The territorial organisation of the GM is as follows:

 7 "Zonal Gendarmerie Regions" corresponding to the seven metropolitan National Defense Zones. 
 18 Mobile Gendarmerie Groupings including one armoured grouping based in Satory, near Versailles in the Paris area.
 109 squadrons(), each led by a major or a captain.
 1 National Gendarmerie Intervention Group (GIGN) with a central unit and fourteen regional branches called AGIGNs). Their missions include counter-terrorism, hostage rescue, surveillance of national threats, protection of government officials and targeting of organized crime. GIGN is able to deploy a 200 men hostage rescue team to manage a major crisis.
 approx. 12,000 personnel.

The Gendarmerie has a dedicated training facility, the National Gendarmerie forces training center, in Saint-Astier (Dordogne), which duplicates an urban environment. Every squadron takes a two-week refresher training in riot-control techniques there every second year.

18 to 20 of the 109 squadrons are permanently deployed on a rotational basis in the French overseas departments and territories.

Until 2015, there used to be Reserve Mobile Gendarmerie squadrons but they were disestablished and all reserve personnel are now regrouped in reserve Departmental Gendarmerie units.

Zonal Gendarmerie Regions
Since 2016, metropolitan France has been divided into 12 administrative regions (plus Corsica) and the Departmental Gendarmerie has followed this pattern with 13 Gendarmerie Regions. The general officer in charge of a region whose capital is also the seat of a Defense Zone (called a Zonal Region) heads all Mobile Gendarmerie forces of that region. The number of Zonal regions, which went down from nine to seven in 2000, was left unchanged in the 2016 reform.

Mobile Gendarmerie Groupings
A grouping is an administrative echelon under the command of a lieutenant-colonel, a "full" colonel or a Brigadier General. Groupings are comparable to battalions or regiments but, contrary to theses units, their size is not standardized as they include from four to ten squadrons. Where the situation so warrants (large demonstrations or public events etc.), squadrons from different groupings can be gathered into a "Tactical Gendarmerie Grouping" under the operational command of a grouping commander. If need be, several GTGs form an "Operational Grouping for Maintaining Order" under the command of a full colonel.

Mobile Gendarmerie squadrons

A mobile squadron of gendarmes is composed of: approx. 115 personnel members (including female gendarmes) under the command of a major or a captain. The squadron is organized as follows :

 One headquarters platoon in charge of administration and logistics.
 Four line platoons including three regular and one "Intervention" platoon. The Intervention platoon (Peloton d'Intervention or PI) is specialized in difficult riot control missions such as arrest of violent demonstrators etc. It also reinforces the departmental Gendarmerie for high-risk judicial arrests. It is formed of 18 gendarmes, whose particular missions (arrests, escorts...) require specialised training and equipment.

There are two types of GM squadrons: regular squadrons and armoured squadrons of the armoured grouping equipped with VBRG armoured wheeled vehicles.

On public order mission, a squadron typically deploys three or four platoons (six or eight vans) and a command vehicle.

Each squadron (EGM) is identified by a three-digit number e.g.: EGM 15/6 in Nîmes.

 1st digit = number of the mobile grouping in the region.
 2nd digit = number of the squadron in the grouping.
 3rd digit = number of the zonal region.

National Gendarmerie Intervention Group (GIGN)

 
Groupe d'intervention de la Gendarmerie nationale is the elite law enforcement and special operations unit of the French National Gendarmerie. Its missions include counter-terrorism, hostage rescue, surveillance of national threats, protection of government officials and targeting of organized crime.

Although administratively part of the Mobile Gendarmerie, GIGN is in fact an independent unit that reports directly to the Director general of the Gendarmerie Nationale (DGGN) i.e. the chief of staff of the Gendarmerie. The DGGN can take charge in a major crisis; however, most of the day-to-day missions are conducted in support of local units of the Departmental Gendarmerie.

In addition to the main unit, based in Satory (Versailles near Paris), there are fourteen GIGN regional branches (seven in metropolitan France and seven in the overseas departments and territories). These regional units, which were formerly attached to various Mobile Gendarmerie groupings or to the Overseas Gendarmerie command, were fully integrated into GIGN on 1 August 2021.  .

Gallery

See also
 Compagnies Républicaines de Sécurité
 Internal Troops
 OMON

Notes

References

Bibliography

 
 
 
 
 

French Gendarmerie
1921 establishments in France